|}

The Festival Trophy is a Premier Handicap National Hunt steeplechase in Great Britain which is open to horses aged five years or older. It is run on the Old Course at Cheltenham over a distance of about 3 miles and 1 furlong, and during its running there are twenty fences to be jumped. It is a handicap race, and it is scheduled to take place each year on the opening day of the Cheltenham Festival in March.

The event was originally known as the National Hunt Handicap Chase, but its title has included the name of a sponsor from the early 1980s. It was backed by Ritz Club from 1981 until 1996, Astec Buzz Shop in 1997 and William Hill between 1998 and 2010. In 2011 the race was run as the Stewart Family Spinal Research Handicap Chase and sponsored by the Stewart family, headed by businessman and racehorse owner Andy Stewart to raise awareness of, and highlight the work done by, the charity Spinal Research. In 2012 and 2013 the race was sponsored by JLT Specialty Ltd, and in 2014 Baylis & Harding were the sponsors. Since 2015 the race has been sponsored by Ultima Business Solutions. It held Grade 3 status until 2022 and was re-classified as a Premier Handicap from the 2023 running when Grade 3 status was renamed by the British Horseracing Authority.

Winners of the race often take part in the Grand National, although not always in the same year. Horses to have achieved victory in both events include Royal Tan, Team Spirit, West Tip, Seagram and Rough Quest.

Records
Most successful horse since 1946 (2 wins):
 Sentina – 1957, 1958
 Scot Lane – 1982, 1983
 Un Temps Pour Tout – 2016, 2017
 Corach Rambler- 2022, 2023 

Leading jockey since 1946 (3 wins):
 Robert Thornton – Fork Lightning (2004), Kelami (2005), Bensalem (2011)
 Tom Scudamore – An Accordion (2008), Un Temps Pour Tout (2016, 2017)

Leading trainer since 1946 (4 wins):
 Fred Rimell – Cavaliero (1948), Frere Jacques II (1949), Land Fort (1951), Holly Bank (1954)
 Fulke Walwyn – Ravencroft (1961), Team Spirit (1963), Lord Jim (1971), Gay Vulgan (1977)

Winners since 1946
 Weights given in stones and pounds.

See also
 Horse racing in Great Britain
 List of British National Hunt races

References

 Racing Post:

 pedigreequery.com – William Hill Trophy Handicap Chase – Cheltenham.
 racenewsonline.co.uk – Racenews Archive (21 February 2008).
 
 Race Recordings 

National Hunt races in Great Britain
Cheltenham Racecourse
National Hunt chases